Tsentralny City District (lit. Central District) is a district of the city of Barnaul, Altai Krai, Russia. Its area is ca. . Population:

Overview
Established on February 7, 1938, it is one of the oldest city districts. It serves as an economic, historical, and transportation core of Barnaul. It borders the Ob River in the southeast and several districts in the north.

Population
After 2002, the following inhabited localities were merged into the city district: Yuzhny, Lebyazhye, Tsentralny, Belmesevo, Konyukhi, Mokhnatushka, Chernitsk, Yagodnoye, Borzovaya Zaimka, Sadovodov, Plodopitomnik, Polzunovo, and Zaton, which led to the significant increase of the population.

Sights
Places of interest include Demidov Square, Red Department Store, Nagorny Park, Tsentralny Park, Pokrovsky Cathedral, Polyakov's House, and more.

Gallery

References

Barnaul